The 2017–18 season was Dukla Prague's seventh consecutive season in the Czech First League.

Players

Squad information

Transfers

In 
Over the summer, forwards Ivan Schranz arrived from Slovak outfit Trnava, and Uroš Đuranović signed from FK Dečić.

The defence was strengthened with Ivan Ostojić signing a two-year deal, arriving from Cypriot side Karmiotissa, as well as Martin Jiránek arriving from Příbram. 
 
Ladislav Vopat returned to the club after his loan at České Budějovice. There were further arrivals in September: midfielder Lukáš Holík joined from Zlín and former national team defender Mario Holek joined on loan from Sparta Prague.

In January 2018 Ivorian midfielder Mohamed Doumbia joined the club from Finnish second-tier side Ekenäs IF, signing a contract until the end of the 2018–19 season. Former Dukla striker Néstor Albiach joined the club on a short-term loan from Sparta Prague in February 2018.

Out 
Three defenders left the club over the summer: Lukáš Štetina left to join Sparta Prague, Jan Šimůnek moved to Vasas SC in Hungary, while Michal Smejkal finished his professional career. Midfielder Jan Juroška joined league rivals Slovácko. Emmanuel Edmond also left the club. Striker Peter Olayinka returned to Ghent after the end of his year-long loan.

In the winter break, midfielder Zinedin Mustedanagić returned to Sparta Prague after the expiry of his loan. Róbert Kovaľ, also a midfielder, went out on loan to former club Zemplín Michalovce.

Management and coaching staff

Source:

Statistics

Appearances and goals

Home attendance
The club had the lowest average attendance in the league.

Czech First League

Results by round

Results summary

League table

Matches

July

August

September

October

November

December

February

March

April

May

Cup 

As a First League team, Dukla entered the Cup at the second round stage. In the second round, Dukla faced Bohemian Football League side Převýšov, the same opponent at the same stage in the previous season. Dukla won the match 2–0 away from home. The third round match was away against Jiskra Domažlice, a team which had beaten Dukla in the second round of the 2014–15 competition. Despite taking a 1–0 lead into half time, Dukla conceded three goals in the second half and lost 3–2, signalling the end of this season's cup run.

References 

Dukla Prague
FK Dukla Prague seasons